Robert Rankin (born 1949) is a British science fiction and fantasy author.

Robert Rankin may also refer to:

 Bob Rankin (born 1969), American politician
 Bobby Rankin (1905–1954), Scottish footballer
 Robert Rankin (timber merchant) (1801–1870), Scottish-Canadian timber merchant and shipowner
 Robert Alexander Rankin (1915–2001), Scottish mathematician
 Robert William Rankin (1907–1942), Australian naval officer
 Robert Rankin (Australian politician) (1896–1955), Australian politician
 Sir Robert Rankin, 1st Baronet (1877–1960), British Member of Parliament for Liverpool Kirkdale, 1931–1945
Robert J. Rankin (1915–2013), American flying ace during World War II